Joanna Klink is an American poet. She was born in Iowa City, Iowa. She received an M.F.A. in Poetry from the Iowa Writers' Workshop and a Ph.D. in Humanities from Johns Hopkins University. She was the Briggs-Copeland Poet at Harvard University and for many years taught in the Creative Writing Program at The University of Montana. She currently teaches at UT Austin's Michener Center for Writers. Her most recent book, The Nightfields, was published July 7, 2020 by Penguin Books.

Publications
 They Are Sleeping (University of Georgia Press, 2000)
 Circadian (Penguin Books, 2007)
 Raptus (Penguin Books, 2010)
 Excerpts from a Secret Prophecy (Penguin Books, 2015)
 The Nightfields (Penguin Books, 2020)

Honors and awards
 Rona Jaffe Foundation Writers' Award (2003) 
 Briggs-Copeland Poet, Harvard University (2008-2011)
 Jeannette Haien Ballard Writer's Award (2012)
 Civitella Ranieri (2012, 2017)
 American Academy of Arts and Letters (2013)
 Amy Lowell Poetry Traveling Scholarship (2018)
 The Bogliasco Foundation (2018)
John Simon Guggenheim Fellowship (2019)

External links
 Official website
 Penguin Author Page

References 

Year of birth missing (living people)
Living people
21st-century American poets
Harvard University faculty
Iowa Writers' Workshop alumni
Johns Hopkins University alumni
Writers from Iowa City, Iowa
University of Iowa alumni
University of Montana faculty
American women poets
21st-century American women writers
Rona Jaffe Foundation Writers' Award winners
American women academics